Goran Cvijanović (born 9 September 1986) is a retired Slovenian footballer who played as a midfielder.

Personal life
Cvijanović spent his early years in Nova Gorica, and moved to Šempeter pri Gorici when he was seven years old. His cousin Miroslav Cvijanović is also a former footballer.

Honours

Gorica
Slovenian Championship: 2005–06

Maribor
Slovenian Championship: 2010–11, 2011–12, 2012–13, 2013–14
Slovenian Cup: 2011–12, 2012–13
Slovenian Supercup: 2012, 2013

Arka Gdynia
Polish SuperCup: 2018

References

External links
Goran Cvijanović at NZS 

1986 births
Living people
People from Šempeter pri Gorici
Slovenian footballers
Association football midfielders
ND Gorica players
NK Maribor players
HNK Rijeka players
Al-Arabi SC (Kuwait) players
NK Celje players
Korona Kielce players
Arka Gdynia players
Slovenian PrvaLiga players
Croatian Football League players
Kuwait Premier League players
Ekstraklasa players
Slovenian expatriate footballers
Slovenian expatriate sportspeople in Croatia
Expatriate footballers in Croatia
Slovenian expatriate sportspeople in Kuwait
Expatriate footballers in Kuwait
Slovenian expatriate sportspeople in Poland
Expatriate footballers in Poland
Slovenia youth international footballers
Slovenia under-21 international footballers
Slovenia international footballers